Ostankino may refer to:
Ostankino District, Moscow
Ostankino Technical Center, Moscow, a television studio and technical center
Ostankino Tower, a free-standing television and radio tower in Moscow
Ostankino Palace, a former summer residence and private opera theater of Sheremetev family
Channel One Russia, formerly run by Russian State TV and Radio Company Ostankino (RGTRK Ostankino)